Charles Herbert "Lefty" Jackson (February 7, 1894 – May 27, 1968) was an outfielder in Major League Baseball. He played for the Chicago White Sox and Pittsburgh Pirates.

External links

1894 births
1968 deaths
Major League Baseball outfielders
Chicago White Sox players
Pittsburgh Pirates players
Bloomington Bloomers players
Los Angeles Angels (minor league) players
Spokane Indians players
Minneapolis Millers (baseball) players
St. Joseph Saints players
Baseball players from Illinois
People from Granite City, Illinois